"New York City" is a song recorded by Australian singer Kylie Minogue. It was released for digital download and contemporary hit radio on 3 May 2019 by BMG as the lead single from her fourth major greatest hits album, Step Back in Time: The Definitive Collection (2019). The song was written by Minogue, Myles MacInnes, Karen Poole and its producer DJ Fresh. "New York City" contains a sample of "Drop the Pressure" by Mylo.

Background and composition
Minogue created a demo of "New York City" during the writing process for her fourteenth studio album Golden (2018), but it was not included on the project. The song received a minor announcement in April 2018, when Minogue sang a verse of the song during an interview with Build in New York City. The song was performed in full for the first time at the New York City show of her Kylie Presents Golden promotional tour, at the Bowery Ballroom, subsequently receiving acclaim from both fans and critics. It was later included as part of a Studio 54 medley on the Golden Tour, alongside "Raining Glitter" and "On a Night Like This".

"New York City" runs for three minutes and 20 seconds. Music critics have described the track as a "funky/disco" styled song, with Joe Lynch from Billboard, stating:

Release
"New York City" was released on 3 May 2019 by record label BMG, and Minogue's own company Darenote Limited, as the lead single from her fourth major greatest hits album, Step Back in Time: The Definitive Collection (2019). The song premiered on BBC Radio 2 on its release day, during The Zoë Ball Breakfast Show.

Music video
On the morning of the track's release, it was announced during ITV breakfast show Lorraine that a music video for "New York City" would be released, comprising various clips of performances taken from Minogue's Golden Tour. Minogue additionally confirmed this during her BBC Radio 2 interview. The music video premiered on her official YouTube channel on 9 May.

Live performances
Minogue first spoke about "New York City" during promotion for Golden, during her interview with BUILD Series in 2018, after a fan had asked her about moving to the city itself, she sang a verse and the bridge acapella, stating it was a song that had stuck with her and her band. After this, the song was included in the set list for her show in the Bowery Ballroom in New York City, as part of the Kylie Presents: Golden shows; the song was performed at second time at the end of the show, following crowd request.

Later in 2018, Minogue included the song in the set list for the Golden Tour, where it was performed during the Studio 54 section of the show in a medley with "Raining Glitter" and "On a Night Like This".

Track listing

Digital download
 "New York City" - 3:21

Streaming single – DJ Fresh edit
 "New York City" (DJ Fresh Edit) - 2:59
 "New York City" - 3:21

Credits and personnel
Credits adapted from Tidal.

 Kylie Minogue – lead vocals, songwriting
 Karen Poole – backing vocals, songwriting
 DJ Fresh – guitar, horn, keyboards, mixing, songwriting, production
 Mylo – sample credit for "Drop the Pressure"

Charts

Release history

References

2019 singles
2019 songs
Kylie Minogue songs
Songs about New York City
Songs written by Karen Poole
Songs written by Kylie Minogue
Song recordings produced by DJ Fresh
Songs written by DJ Fresh
Songs written by Mylo